World Debating Championship may refer to:
World Universities Debating Championship
World Schools Debating Championships